Keston Williams (born 25 March 1988) is an international soccer player from Trinidad and Tobago who plays professionally for Defence Force as a defender.

External links
Soca Warriors

Goal.com profile

1981 births
Living people
Trinidad and Tobago footballers
Trinidad and Tobago international footballers
Association football defenders